9A or 9-A may refer to :
 Gemini 9A, a 1966 manned spaceflight 
 Airco DH.9A, a 1918 British light bomber 
 9A-91, a carbine assault rifle currently in use with Russian police forces
 9-a-side footy, a sport based on Australian rules football
 9A- Croatian aircraft registration prefix (ICAO)

See also
 List of highways numbered 9A
A9 (disambiguation)